Darren O'Rourke is an Irish Sinn Féin politician who has been a Teachta Dála (TD) for the Meath East constituency at the 2020 general election.

Background
Originally from Kells, O'Rourke trained in Dublin Institute of Technology and holds a number of master's degrees from Trinity College Dublin and the Royal College of Surgeons in Ireland.  He was a medical scientist at St. James's Hospital in Dublin.

Political career
O'Rourke was previously a policy advisor to Caoimhghín Ó Caoláin.

He was a member of Meath County Council for the Ashbourne local electoral area from 2014 to 2020. Aisling Ó Néill was co-opted to O'Rourke's seat on Meath County Council following his election to the Dáil.

In 2022, O'Rourke put forward a bill to require all pharmaceutical companies to make their payments to healthcare organisations and professionals public in a register.

References

External links
Darren O'Rourke's page on the Sinn Féin website

Living people
Year of birth missing (living people)
Alumni of Dublin Business School
Alumni of Dublin Institute of Technology
Alumni of the Royal College of Surgeons in Ireland
Alumni of Trinity College Dublin
Local councillors in County Meath
Members of the 33rd Dáil
Sinn Féin TDs (post-1923)